The Murray Bridge tunnel is a heritage-listed railway tunnel located in Murray Bridge, South Australia. The  tunnel houses a single train line as it runs under Bridge Street in Murray Bridge and links the Murray Bridge railway station with the Murray Bridge Railway Bridge over the River Murray.

The tunnel was constructed by the cut and cover method when the railway line was diverted from the original mixed road and rail bridge to a new rail-only bridge over the Murray River. The tunnel carries the railway under the main road to the bridge.

See also

List of tunnels in Australia

References

Tunnels in South Australia
Railway tunnels in South Australia
South Australian Heritage Register